Huilong ( unless otherwise noted) may refer to the following locations in China:

Towns
 Huilong, Anhui (会龙镇), in Funan County
 Huilong, Dazu District, Chongqing
 Huilong, Liangping County, Chongqing
 Huilong, Deqing County, Guangdong
 Huilong, Gaoyao, Guangdong
 Huilong, Heyuan, in Longchuan County, Guangdong
 Huilong, Shaoguan, in Xinfeng County, Guangdong
 Huilong, Xingren County, Guizhou
 Huilong, Zunyi, in Xishui County, Guizhou
 Huilong, Hebei (回隆镇), in Wei County, Handan
 Huilong, Hanchuan, Xiaogan, Hubei
 Huilong, Shaanxi, in Zhen'an County
 Huilong, Kaijiang County, Sichuan
 Huilong, Nanchong (会龙镇), in Gaoping District, Nanchong, Sichuan
 Huilong, Qionglai, Sichuan
 Huilong, Suining (会龙镇), in Anju District, Suining, Sichuan
 Huilong, Yingshan County, Sichuan
 Huílóng, Zhongjiang County, Sichuan
 Huìlóng, Zhongjiang County (会龙镇), Sichuan
 Huilong, Zigong, in Da'an District, Zigong, Sichuan

Townships
 Huilong Township, Fujian, in Jianyang
 Huilong Township, Henan, in Tongbai County
 Huilong Township, Hubei, in Fang County, Shiyan, Hubei
 Huilong Township, Hunan, in Yongshun County
 Huilong Township, Shanxi, in Jiaokou County
 Huilong Township, Mao County, Sichuan
 Huilong Township, Mianning County, Sichuan
 Huilong Township, Ziyang, in Yanjiang District, Ziyang, Sichuan
 Huilong Yi Ethnic Township (回隆彝族乡), Shimian County, Sichuan